Duane Eddy (born April 26, 1938) is an American rock and roll guitarist. In the late 1950s and early 1960s, he had a string of hit records produced by Lee Hazlewood, which were noted for their characteristically "twangy" sound, including "Rebel-'Rouser", "Peter Gunn", and "Because They're Young". He had sold 12 million records by 1963.

He was inducted into the Rock and Roll Hall of Fame in 1994, and the Musicians Hall of Fame and Museum in 2008.

Early life
Eddy was born in Corning, New York. He began playing the guitar at the age of five. In 1951, his family moved to Tucson, and then to Coolidge, Arizona. At the age of 16 he formed a duo, Jimmy and Duane, with his friend Jimmy Delbridge (who later recorded as Jimmy Dell).

Career

While performing at local radio station KCKY, they met disc jockey Lee Hazlewood, who produced the duo's single, "Soda Fountain Girl", recorded and released in 1955 in Phoenix. Hazlewood then produced Sanford Clark's 1956 hit, "The Fool", featuring guitarist Al Casey, while Eddy and Delbridge performed and appeared on radio stations in Phoenix before joining Buddy Long's Western Melody Boys, playing country music in and around the city.

Eddy devised a technique of playing lead on his guitar's bass strings to produce a low, reverberant "twangy" sound. When he was 19 he had obtained a 1957 Chet Atkins model Gretsch 6120 guitar at Ziggie's Music in Phoenix, Arizona and in November 1957, Eddy recorded an instrumental, "Movin' n' Groovin'", co-written by Eddy and Hazlewood. As the Phoenix studio had no echo chamber, Hazlewood bought a 2,000-gallon (7570-litre) water storage tank that he used as an echo chamber to accentuate the "twangy" guitar sound. In 1958, Eddy signed a recording contract with Lester Sill and Lee Hazlewood to record in Phoenix at the Audio Recorders studio. Sill and Hazlewood leased the tapes of all the singles and albums to the Philadelphia-based Jamie Records.

"Movin' n' Groovin'" reached number 72 on the Billboard Hot 100 in early 1958; the opening riff, borrowed from Chuck Berry's "Brown Eyed Handsome Man", was in turn copied a few years later by the Beach Boys on "Surfin' U.S.A.". The follow-up, "Rebel-'Rouser", featured a overdubbed saxophone by Los Angeles session musician Gil Bernal, and yells and handclaps by doo-wop group the Rivingtons. The tune became Eddy's breakthrough hit, reaching number 6 on the Billboard Hot 100 chart. It sold over one million copies, earning Eddy his first gold disc.

Eddy had a succession of hit records over the next few years, and his band members, including Steve Douglas, saxophonist Jim Horn, and keyboard player Larry Knechtel went on to work as part of Phil Spector's Wrecking Crew. According to writer Richie Unterberger, "The singles — 'Peter Gunn', 'Cannonball', 'Shazam', and 'Forty Miles of Bad Road' were probably the best — also did their part to help keep the raunchy spirit of rock and roll alive, during a time in which it was in danger of being watered down." On January 9, 1958, Eddy's debut album, Have 'Twangy' Guitar Will Travel, was released, reaching number five, and remaining on the album charts for 82 weeks. On his fourth album, Songs of Our Heritage (1960), each track featured him playing acoustic guitar or banjo. Eddy's biggest hit came with the theme of the movie Because They're Young in 1960, which featured a string arrangement, and reached a chart peak of number four in America and number two in the UK in September 1960. It became his second million-selling disc. Eddy's records were consistently even more successful in the UK than they were in his native United States, and in 1960, readers of the UK's NME voted him World's Number One Musical Personality, ousting Elvis Presley.

In 1960, Eddy signed a contract directly with Jamie Records, bypassing Sill and Hazlewood. This caused a temporary rift between Eddy and Hazlewood. The result was that for the duration of his contract with Jamie, Eddy produced his own singles and albums.

Duane Eddy and the Rebels became a frequent act on The Dick Clark Show.

During the 1960s, Eddy launched an acting career, appearing in such films as A Thunder of Drums, The Wild Westerners, Kona Coast, and The Savage Seven, and two appearances on the television series Have Gun – Will Travel. He married singer Jessi Colter in 1961, the same year he signed a three-year contract with Paul Anka's production company, Camy, whose recordings were issued by RCA Victor. In the early days of recording in the RCA Victor studios, he renewed contact with Lee Hazlewood, who became involved in a number of his RCA Victor singles and albums. Eddy's 1962 single release, "(Dance With The) Guitar Man", co-written with Hazlewood, earned his third gold disc by selling a million records.

In the 1970s, he produced album projects for Phil Everly and Waylon Jennings. In 1972, he worked with Al Gorgoni, rhythm guitar, on BJ Thomas's "Rock and Roll Lullaby". In 1975, a collaboration with hit songwriter Tony Macaulay and former founding member of The Seekers, Keith Potger, led to another UK top-10 record, "Play Me Like You Play Your Guitar". The single, "You Are My Sunshine", featuring Willie Nelson and Waylon Jennings, hit the country charts in 1977.

In 1986, Eddy recorded with Art of Noise, remaking his 1960 version of Henry Mancini's "Peter Gunn". The song was a top-10 hit around the world, ranking number one on Rolling Stone'''s dance chart for six weeks that summer. "Peter Gunn" won the Grammy for Best Rock Instrumental of 1986. It also gave Eddy the distinction of being the only instrumentalist to have had top-10 hit singles in four different decades in the UK. (Although his 1975 top-10 hit featured a female vocal group).

The following year, Duane Eddy was released on Capitol. Several of the tracks were produced by Paul McCartney, Jeff Lynne, Ry Cooder, and Art of Noise. Guest artists and musicians included John Fogerty, George Harrison, Paul McCartney, Ry Cooder, James Burton, David Lindley, Phil Pickett, Steve Cropper, and original Rebels, Larry Knechtel and Jim Horn. The album included a cover of Paul McCartney's 1979 instrumental, "Rockestra Theme". In 1982, Duane Eddy's "Rebel Walk" was heard in the musical comedy, Grease 2, featured as background music at the bowling alley, when the T-Birds rushed to face rival Leo Balmudo. Though it was not a part of the original soundtrack, it was mentioned in the film's credits. In 1992, Eddy recorded a duet with Hank Marvin on Marvin's album Into the Light, with a cover version of The Chantays' 1963 hit "Pipeline".

Eddy's "Rebel Rouser" was featured that same year in Forrest Gump. Oliver Stone's Natural Born Killers used "The Trembler", a track written by Eddy and Ravi Shankar. Also in 1994, Eddy teamed up with Carl Perkins and The Mavericks to contribute "Matchbox" to the AIDS benefit album Red Hot + Country produced by the Red Hot Organization. Eddy was the lead guitarist on Foreigner's 1995 hit "Until the end of Time", which reached the top 10 on the Billboard Adult Contemporary chart. In 1996, Eddy played guitar on Hans Zimmer's soundtrack for the film Broken Arrow.

In October 2010, Eddy returned to the UK at a sold-out Royal Festival Hall in London. This success prompted the subsequent album for Mad Monkey/EMI, which was produced by Richard Hawley in Sheffield, England. The album, Road Trip, was released on June 20, 2011. Mojo placed the album at number 37 on its list of "Top 50 albums of 2011." Eddy performed at the Glastonbury Festival on June 26, 2011.

For an 80th-birthday tour in 2018, Eddy returned to the UK in concerts with Liverpudlian singer-songwriter Robert Vincent, performing on October 23 at the London Palladium, and October 30 at Bridgewater Hall in Manchester.

Honors
In the spring of 1994, Eddy was inducted into the Rock and Roll Hall of Fame.

On April 5, 2000, at the Ryman Auditorium in Nashville, Tennessee, the title "Titan of Twang" was bestowed upon Eddy by the mayor.

In 2004, Eddy was presented with the Guitar Player Magazine "Legend Award". Eddy was the second recipient of the award, the first being presented to Les Paul.

Legacy
Among those who have acknowledged Eddy's influence are George Harrison, Dave Davies, Hank Marvin, the Ventures, John Entwistle, Bruce Springsteen, Adrian Belew, Bill Nelson, Mark Knopfler, and Ben Vaughn.

Signature guitars

Eddy's favored guitar was a 1957 Chet Atkins Gretsch 6120 guitar that he bought at Ziggie's Music in Phoenix, Arizona in 1957 (for which he had traded in his gold top Gibson Les Paul Standard guitar from the early 1950s plus monthly payments of $17,-).   From 1959's The "Twangs" the "Thang" LP he also used a Danelectro six-string bass guitar.

Eddy was the first rock and roll guitarist to have a signature model guitar  , as in 1961 the Guild Guitar Company introduced the Duane Eddy signature models DE-400 and the deluxe DE-500. A limited edition of the DE-500 model was reissued briefly in 1983 to mark Eddy's 25th anniversary in the recording industry. In 1997, 40 years after he had bought his Gretsch Chet Atkins 6120, Gretsch started production of the Duane Eddy Signature Model, the Gretsch 6120-DE. In 2004, the Gibson Custom Art and Historic Division introduced the new Duane Eddy Signature Gibson guitar. A new Gretsch G6120DE Duane Eddy Signature model was released in spring 2011 and in 2018 Gretsch released the G6120TB-DE Duane Eddy 6-string bass model.

Awards

 Number One World Musical Personality in the NME Poll (UK: 1960)
 Grammy Winner – Best Rock Instrumental – "Peter Gunn"  (1986)
 Grammy Nomination – Best Country Instrumental – (Doc Watson album) (1992)
 Rock and Roll Hall of Fame Member (1994)
 Rockwalk Induction (1997)
 Presented with "Chetty" award by Chet Atkins (2000)
 Guitar Player Magazine Legend Award (2004)
 Musicians Hall of Fame Member (2008)
 Mojo Icon Award (UK: 2010)

Discography

Singles
{| class="sortable wikitable"
|-
!rowspan="2"|Year !!rowspan="2"|TitlesBoth sides from same album except where indicated !!colspan="3"|Chart positions !!rowspan="2"|Album
|-
!Billboard !!Cashbox!!UK
|-
! 1955
| "I Want Some Lovin'"b/w "Soda Fountain Girl"Shown as "Jimmy & Duane with Buddy Long & The Western Melody Boys" || align=center|- || align=center|- || align=center|- || align=center| Non-LP tracks
|-
! rowspan=4| 1958
| "Moovin' n' Groovin'"b/w "Up and Down" (From $1,000,000 Worth of Twang, Volume II) || align=center|72|| align=center|54|| align=center|- || style="text-align:center;" rowspan="5"|Have "Twangy" Guitar Will Travel|-
| "Rebel-'Rouser"b/w "Stalkin'" || align=center|6|| align=center|7|| align=center|19
|-
| "Ramrod"b/w "The Walker" (Non-LP track) || align=center|27|| align=center|33|| align=center|-
|-
| "Cannonball"b/w "Mason Dixon Lion" (Non-LP track) || align=center|15|| align=center|16|| align=center|22
|-
! rowspan=7| 1959
| "The Lonely One"b/w "Detour" || align=center|23|| align=center|19|| align=center|-
|-
| "Peter Gunn"b/w "Yep!" || style="text-align:center;" colspan="2"|(see 1960)|| align=center|6 || style="text-align:center;" rowspan="2"|Especially for You|-
| "Yep!"b/w "Three-30-Blues" (from Have "Twangy" Guitar Will Travel) || align=center|30|| align=center|27|| align=center|17
|-
| "Forty Miles of Bad Road" / || align=center|9|| align=center|10|| align=center|11 || style="text-align:center;" rowspan="5"|$1,000,000 Worth of Twang|-
| "The Quiet Three" || align=center|46||align=center|68|| align=center|-
|-
| "Some Kind-a Earthquake" / || align=center|37|| align=center|28|| align=center|12
|-
| "First Love, First Tears" || align=center|59|| align=center|75|| align=center|-
|-
! rowspan=5| 1960
| "Bonnie Came Back"b/w "Lost Island" (Non-LP track) || align=center|26|| align=center|20|| align=center|12
|-
| "Shazam!"b/w "The Secret Seven" (Non-LP track) || align=center|45|| align=center|41|| align=center|4 || align=center|Duane Eddy's 16 Greatest Hits|-
| "Because They're Young"b/w "Rebel Walk" (from The "Twangs" The "Thang") || align=center|4|| align=center|3|| align=center|2 || style="text-align:center;" rowspan="2"|$1,000,000 Worth of Twang|-
| "Kommotion"b/w "Theme for Moon Children" || align=center|78|| align=center|39|| align=center|13
|-
| "Peter Gunn"b/w "Along the Navajo Trail" || align=center|27|| align=center|26 || align=center|(see 1959) || align=center|Especially For You|-
! rowspan=7| 1961
| "Pepe"b/w "Lost Friend" || align=center|18|| align=center|19|| align=center|2 || style="text-align:center;" rowspan="3"|$1,000,000 Worth of Twang, Volume II|-
| "Theme from Dixie" / || align=center|39|| align=center|37|| align=center|7
|-
| "Gidget Goes Hawaiian" || align=center|101|| align=center|-|| align=center|-
|-
| "Ring of Fire"b/w "Bobbie" (from $1,000,000 Worth of Twang, Volume II) || align=center|84|| align=center|57|| align=center|17 || style="text-align:center;"|Non-LP track
|-
| "Drivin' Home"b/w "Tammy" (from Girls! Girls! Girls!) || align=center|87|| align=center|69|| align=center|30 || align=center|$1,000,000 Worth of Twang, Volume II|-
| "My Blue Heaven"b/w "Along Came Linda" (from Especially for You) || align=center|50|| align=center|81|| align=center|- || align=center|The "Twangs" the "Thang"|-
| "Caravan" (Part 1)b/w "Caravan" (Part 2) || align=center|-|| align=center|-|| align=center|42 || style="text-align:center;" rowspan="2"|Non-LP tracks
|-
! rowspan=7| 1962
| "The Avenger"b/w "Londonderry Air" || align=center|101|| align=center|-|| align=center|-
|-
| "Moanin' 'n' Twistin'" || align=center|18|| align=center|19|| align=center|2 || align=center|Twistin' 'n' Twangin|-
| "The Battle"b/w "Trambone" || align=center|114||align=center|100||align=center|- || align=center|The "Twangs" the "Thang"
|-
| "Deep in the Heart of Texas"b/w "Saints and Sinners" (Non-LP track) || align=center|78|| align=center|83|| align=center|19 || align=center|The Best of Duane Eddy
|-
| "Runaway Pony"b/w "Just Because" (from Especially for You) || align=center|- || align=center| – || align=center|- || align=center|Non-LP track
|-
| "The Ballad of Paladin"b/w "The Wild Westerners" (Non-LP track) || align=center|33|| align=center|48|| align=center|10 || align=center|The Best of Duane Eddy
|-
| "(Dance with the) Guitar Man"b/w "Stretchin' Out" (Non-LP track) || align=center|12|| align=center|11|| align=center|4 || align=center|Dance with the Guitar Man
|-
! rowspan=3| 1963
| "Boss Guitar"b/w "The Desert Rat" (Non-LP track) || align=center|28|| align=center|30|| align=center|27 || style="text-align:center;" rowspan="3"|The Best of Duane Eddy
|-
| "Lonely Boy, Lonely Guitar"b/w "Joshin'" (Non-LP track) || align=center|82||align=center|76||align=center|35
|-
| "Your Baby's Gone Surfin"b/w "Shuckin'" (Non-LP track) || align=center|93|| align=center|82|| align=center|49
|-
! rowspan="4"|1964
| "The Son of Rebel Rouser"b/w "The Story of Three Loves" || align=center|97|| align=center|90|| align=center|- || align=center|Non-LP tracks
|-
| "Guitar Child"b/w "Jerky Jalopy" (Non-LP track) || align=center|- || align=center| – || align=center|- || align=center|Twangin' Up a Storm
|-
| "Water Skiing"b/w "Theme from 'A Summer Place'" (from Twangin' the Golden Hits) || align=center|- || align=center| – || align=center|- || align=center|Water Skiing
|-
| "Guitar Star"b/w "The Iguana" || align=center|- || align=center|- || align=center|- || style="text-align:center;" rowspan="2"|Non-LP tracks
|-
! rowspan="3"|1965
| "Moon Shot"b/w "Roughneck" || align=center|- || align=center|- || align=center|-
|-
| "Trash"b/w "South Phoenix" || align=center|- || align=center|- || align=center|- || align=center|Duane a Go-Go
|-
| "Don't Think Twice, It's Alright"b/w "The House of the Rising Sun" || align=center|- || align=center|- || align=center|- ||align=center|Duane Eddy Does Bob Dylan
|-
! rowspan="2"|1966
| "El Rancho Grande"b/w "Papa's Movin' On (I'm Movin' On)" || align=center|- || align=center|- || align=center|- ||align=center|Non-LP tracks
|-
| "Daydream"b/w "This Guitar Was Made for Twangin'" || align=center|- || align=center|- || align=center|- || align=center|The Biggest Twang of Them All
|-
! rowspan="2"|1967
| "Roarin'"b/w "Monsoon" (Non-LP track) || align=center|- || align=center|- || align=center|- || align=center|The Roarin' Twangies
|-
| "Guitar on My Mind"b/w "Wicked Woman from Wickenburg" (from The Roarin' Twangies)Shown as by "Duane and Miriam Eddy" || align=center|- || align=center|-|| align=center|-|| style="text-align:center;" rowspan="12"|Non-LP tracks
|-
! rowspan="2"|1968
| "There Is a Mountain"b/w "This Town" || align=center|- || align=center|-|| align=center|-
|-
| "The Satin Hours"b/w "Niki Hoeky" || align=center|- || align=center|-|| align=center|-
|-
! 1969
| "Break My Mind"b/w "Lovingbird" || align=center|- || align=center|-|| align=center|-
|-
! rowspan="2"|1970
| "Freight Train"b/w "Put a Little Love in Your Heart" || align=center|110||align=center|-|| align=center|-
|-
| "Something"b/w "The Five-Seventeen" || align=center|- || align=center|-|| align=center|-
|-
! 1972
| "Renegade"b/w "Nightly News" || align=center|- || align=center|-|| align=center|-
|-
! rowspan="3"|1975
| "Play Me Like You Play Your Guitar"b/w "Blue Montana Sky" || align=center|-|| align=center|- ||align=center|9
|-
| "The Man With The Gold Guitar"b/w "Mark of Zorro" || align=center|- || align=center|-|| align=center|-
|-
| "Love Confusion"b/w "Love is a Warm Emotion" || align=center|- || align=center|-|| align=center|-
|-
! 1976
| "You Are My Sunshine"b/w "From 8 to 7" || align=center|- || align=center|- || align=center|-
|-
! 1986
| "Peter Gunn" (with Art of Noise)b/w "Something Always Happens" (The Art of Noise) || align=center|50||align=center|49||align=center|8
|-
! 1987
| "Spies"b/w "Rockabilly Holiday" || align=center|- || align=center|- || align=center|-|| align=center|Duane Eddy
|}

Studio albums
{| class="wikitable sortable"
!Year !!Title !!U.S. Billboard 200!!UK Albums Chart!!Label and stereo catalogue reference!!Notes
|-
! 1958
|Have 'Twangy' Guitar Will Travel||align=center|5||align=center|6||Jamie JLPS-3000||Original album covers were white with Duane Eddy sitting on guitar case and the LP title in white. Second pressings showed the same cover with the LP title in green and red; third pressings were red album covers with Duane Eddy standing. Note: It is very likely that so-called "original" version white letter covers do not exist. 
|-
! rowspan=2| 1959
|Especially for You ||align=center|24||align=center|6||Jamie JLPS-3006||
|-
|The "Twangs" the "Thang"||align=center|18||align=center|2||Jamie JLPS-3009||
|-
! 1960
|Songs of Our Heritage||align=center|-||align=center|13||Jamie JLPS-3011||Original copies featured gatefold covers, later replaced with regular covers. Also pressed in limited quantities of red vinyl and blue vinyl
|-
! 1961
|Girls! Girls! Girls!||align=center|93||align=center|-||Jamie JLPS-3019||Front cover features photos of Duane Eddy with Brenda Lee and Annette Funicello
|-
! rowspan=3| 1962
|Twistin' with Duane Eddy||align=center|-||align=center|-||Jamie JLPS-3022||
|-
|Twistin' 'N' Twangin'''||align=center|82||align=center|8||RCA LSP-2525||
|-
|Twangy Guitar – Silky Strings||align=center|72||align=center|13||RCA LSP-2576||
|-
! rowspan=4| 1963
|Duane Eddy & The Rebels – In Person (aka Surfin)||align=center|-||align=center|-||Jamie JLPS-3024||
|-
|Dance with the Guitar Man||align=center|47||align=center|14||RCA LSP-2648||
|-
|"Twang" a Country Song||align=center|-||align=center|-||RCA LSP-2681||
|-
|"Twangin'" Up a Storm!||align=center|93||align=center|-||RCA LSP-2700||
|-
! 1964
|Lonely Guitar||align=center|144||align=center|-||RCA LSP-2798||
|-
! rowspan=5| 1965
|Water Skiing||align=center|-||align=center|-||RCA LSP-2918||
|-
|Twangin' the Golden Hits||align=center|-||align=center|-||RCA LSP-2993||
|-
|Twangsville||align=center|-||align=center|-||RCA LSP-3432||
|-
|Duane-a-Go-Go||align=center|-||align=center|-||Colpix CPS-490||
|-
|Duane Eddy Does Bob Dylan||align=center|-||align=center|-||Colpix CPS-494||
|-
! 1966
|The Biggest Twang of All||align=center|-||align=center|-||Reprise RS-6218||
|-
! rowspan=2| 1967
|The Roaring Twangies||align=center|-||align=center|-||Reprise RS-6240||
|-
|Tokyo Hits||align=center|-||align=center|-||Reprise||Japan only release
|- cover.
! 1987
|Duane Eddy & The Rebels||align=center|-||align=center|-||Capitol ST-12567 ||
|-
! 2011
|Road Trip||align=center|-||align=center|116||Mad Monkey/EMI MAD1||
|-
|}

Compilations

Film appearances
 Because They're Young (1960)
 A Thunder of Drums (1961)
 The Wild Westerners (1962)
 The Savage Seven (1968)
Kona Coast (1968)

References

Further reading
 Furek, Maxim, The Jordan Brothers: A Musical Biography of Rock's Fortunate Sons. Kimberley Press, 1986.
 Hardy, Phil and Dave Laing, Encyclopedia of Rock, Schrimner Books, 1987.
 Stambler, Irwin, The Encyclopedia of Pop, Rock and Soul, St. Martin's, 1989.
 Rees, Dafydd, and Luke Crampton, Rock Movers & Shakers, ABC-CLIO, 1991.
 The Rolling Stone Encyclopedia of Rock and Roll edited by Jon Pareles and Patr Romanowski, Rolling Stone Press/Summit Books, 1993.
 Morritt, Bob, Rockin' in the Desert contains authorized biography, edited by Duane Eddy, Canaan-Star Publishing, 2012.

External links

 The Duane Eddy site
 
 Discography at Duane Eddy tribute page
 Career overview radio interview
Duane Eddy Interview - NAMM Oral History Library (2009)

1938 births
Living people
American rockabilly guitarists
American rock guitarists
Lead guitarists
Surf musicians
American country guitarists
American rock musicians
Jamie Records artists
RCA Victor artists
Colpix Records artists
Reprise Records artists
People from Corning, New York
People from Coolidge, Arizona
Grammy Award winners
Roulette Records artists
Musicians from Phoenix, Arizona
Songwriters from New York (state)
Songwriters from Arizona
Singers from Arizona
Guitarists from Arizona
Guitarists from New York (state)
American male guitarists
20th-century American guitarists
Country musicians from New York (state)
Country musicians from Arizona
20th-century American male musicians
American male songwriters